"I'm Still Standing" is a song written by English musician Elton John and songwriter Bernie Taupin, from John's 1983 album Too Low for Zero. It was the second single released from the album in the UK, and the first single released in the United States.

Helped by a video promoting the song on MTV, "I'm Still Standing" became a big hit for John on both sides of the Atlantic, peaking at No. 1 in Canada and Switzerland, No. 4 in the UK and No. 12 on the U.S. Billboard Hot 100.

Music video
The music video, directed by Russell Mulcahy, was shot in Cannes and Nice on the Côte d'Azur in France. It also features the colours of the Flag of France. Arlene Phillips, who choreographed the video, said her work on the video is one of the proudest moments in her entire career (via the Channel 5 pop-documentary, Britain's Favourite 80s Songs, on 25 December 2021).

Bruno Tonioli, later a judge on hit shows Strictly Come Dancing for BBC (UK) and Dancing with the Stars for ABC (US), appears as one of the dancers in the video.

It was due to be shot over the course of two days, but a camera full of the first day's film was ruined, when Mulcahy accidentally fell into the sea with it. Therefore, it had to be filmed again on another day. During the shoot for the video, John came across Duran Duran. He complained he was exhausted at having been up since 4 o'clock in the morning. Simon Le Bon decided John should have a martini. "So I did," John later recalled, "I had six."

In his book, Wild Boy: My Life in Duran Duran, Andy Taylor writes of the experience:
There were lots of celebrities around in Cannes and one day we discovered that Elton John was in town, filming the video for his song "I'm Still Standing". This was before Elton became teetotal, so he was still a steaming party animal. We went up to see him at his hotel and spent the afternoon getting blasted on martinis. We decided it would be a laugh to get him drunk and we were slinging the drinks down him. "Ooh, you are lovely boys," he screeched, loving every minute of it. We got him so drunk that eventually he went upstairs and threw a wobbler in his suite. It caused all sorts of chaos, but it was a great party.

The next morning, John awoke with a hangover and wandered into his personal assistant's room – which was "leveled" – and asked him "What happened?" His assistant laughed: "You happened!"

In 2019, the original 16mm film negatives were re-scanned and the computer graphics were recreated, forming a newer remastered version of the promotional video. This version of the video serves as the ending to the 2019 biopic Rocketman, with Taron Egerton (portraying John) rotoscoped in to recreate memorable scenes from the original music video. It was also re-released standalone on John's YouTube channel.

Track listing
US 7-inch single
 "I'm Still Standing" – 3:00
 "Love So Cold" – 5:08

UK 7-inch single
 "I'm Still Standing" – 3:00
 "Earn While You Learn" – 6:42
This single was also available as a picture disc shaped as a piano.
UK 12-inch single
 "I'm Still Standing" (extended version) – 3:45
 "Earn While You Learn" – 6:42

Personnel 
 Elton John – lead vocals, acoustic piano, synthesizers
 Davey Johnstone – electric guitars, backing vocals
 Dee Murray – bass, backing vocals
 Nigel Olsson – drums, backing vocals

Chart performance

Weekly charts

Year-end charts

Certifications

Other versions
Welsh actor Taron Egerton has recorded this song two times in separate occasions. The first time was for the 2016 animated feature Sing as teenage gorilla Johnny; the second was for the 2019 biopic Rocketman where he played the titular role of Elton John himself.

References

External links
 

1983 singles
Elton John songs
Number-one singles in Switzerland
RPM Top Singles number-one singles
British synth-pop songs
Music videos directed by Russell Mulcahy
Songs with music by Elton John
Songs with lyrics by Bernie Taupin
Song recordings produced by Chris Thomas (record producer)
1983 songs
The Rocket Record Company singles
Geffen Records singles